Electoral district of Wickham may refer to:

 Electoral district of Wickham (New South Wales)
 Electoral district of Wickham (Queensland)